W. A. G. Payment Solutions, trading as Eurowag, is a business which processes freight and road payments across Europe. The company is listed on the London Stock Exchange and is a constituent of the FTSE 250 Index.

History
The company was founded by Martin Vohánka as a petroleum trader in the Czech Republic under the name "W. A. G. Group" in 1995. It launched its payment services platform, which operated under the trade name of "Eurowag", in 2000. As of May 2021, the company was owned 59.1% by Vohánka and 32.7% by TA Associates.

The company was the subject of an initial public offering on the London Stock Exchange in October 2021. Then, in November 2021, the company acquired WebEye, a telematics business. In April 2022, it collaborated with a Fintech company, Factris, to offer "Eurowag Cash", which enables customers to factor their customer invoices.

Operations
The company processes fuel and toll payments for heavy goods vehicle driver across Europe.

References

External links
Official site

Companies established in 1995
Companies listed on the London Stock Exchange